This is a list of neighborhoods in Salt Lake City.  As a major city, Salt Lake City urbanized in the early 1900s and now has many distinct neighborhoods.

Larger and/or most prominent neighborhoods include, with their approximate boundaries:
9th and 9th, area near 900 East and 900 South, running from 800 East to 1100 East and from 800 South to 1300 South
The Avenues, which extend north from South Temple to the city limits, running east from State Street to Virginia Street
Ballpark, running south from 900 South to 2100 South, and west from State Street to Interstate 15. Named for Smith's Ballpark.
Buena Vista, north of California Avenue, west of Glendale; adjacent to Salt Lake International Airport
Capitol Hill, extending north from South Temple to the city limits, bounded between State Street on the east and 500 West on the west
Central City, between State Street and 700 East, from South Temple south to 700 South
Central City West, running west from 300 West to Interstate 15, going south from South Temple to 1300 South
Downtown, extending south from South Temple to 700 South, between State Street and 300 West
East Central, extending east from 700 East to 1300 East, south from South Temple to 1300 South 
Fairpark, running west from 500 West to 1460 West, running north from North Temple to 600 North
Federal Heights, running east from Virginia Street to the University of Utah, bounded on the south by 100 South and on the north by Federal Heights Drive
Foothill and East Bench, running east from 1300 East to the city limits, running south from 500 South to Interstate 80
Glendale, west of Interstate 15 and running west to the city limits, bounded between 950 South on the north and 2100 South on the south
Jordan Meadows, extending west from 1460 West to city limits, north from North Temple to 700 North
Liberty Wells, going east from State Street to 700 East, going south from 900 South to 2100 South
Marmalade District, bounded between 300 North on the south to 500 North on the north, and bounded on the west by Quince Street and on the east by Center Street
Poplar Grove, also west of Interstate 15, running to the city limits, bounded by North Temple on the north and 950 South on the south
Rose Park, extending west from Interstate 15 to Redwood Road, running north from 600 North to city limits
Sugar House, running east from 700 East to Foothill Drive, running south from 1700 South to the city limits
University, running east from 1100 East to University St., and south from South Temple to 500 South
Westpointe, extending west from Redwood Road to city limits, running north from 700 North to city limits
Yalecrest, between 1300 East and 1500 East, between Sunnyside Avenue (800 South) and 1300 South

References

External links

Salt Lake City
Geography of Salt Lake City

Salt Lake City